Godfather Mendoza (Spanish: El compadre Mendoza) is a 1934 Mexican film. It was directed by Fernando de Fuentes, and is the second of his Revolution Trilogy, preceded by El prisionero trece and followed by Vámonos con Pancho Villa.

In 1994, the Mexican magazine Somos published a list of "The 100 best movies of the cinema of Mexico" in its 100th edition and choose El compadre Mendoza the 3rd better of all time, just behind Vámonos con Pancho Villa and Los olvidados.

Plot

This is the story of Rosalío Mendoza, a Mexican landowner during the Mexican Revolution of 1910. Rosalío survives by befriending both the army and the revolutionaries. Everyone is welcomed in his ranch, but the situation becomes unbearable and Rosalío must choose whose side he is on.

Cast
Various of main cast appeared in more than one movie of the trilogy:

Alfredo del Diestro
Carmen Guerrero
Antonio R. Frausto
Luis G. Barreiro
Emma Roldán

References

External links
 

1934 films
1930s Spanish-language films
Films directed by Fernando de Fuentes
Films set in the 1910s
Films set in Mexico
Mexican Revolution films
Films shot in Mexico
Mexican black-and-white films
1930s war drama films
Mexican war drama films
1934 drama films
1930s Mexican films